This is a list comprising flags proposed as alternatives to the current flag of Australia, which have received media coverage.

National flags

Sporting flags

See also

 Australian flag debate
 List of Australian flags
 List of proposed New Zealand flags
 List on commons

References

Australia
 
Flags, proposed
Australian flags, proposed
Lists of proposals
Australia
Proposals in Australia